| doctoral_students = 
| notable_students = 
| main_interests = 
| notable_works = 
| notable_ideas = 
| influenced = 
| signature = 
| signature_alt = 
}}
Michael H. Otsuka (born 1964) is an American left-libertarian political philosopher and Professor in the Department of Philosophy at Rutgers University.

Career

Otsuka earned his Doctor of Philosophy degree in politics from Balliol College, Oxford, under the direction of G. A. Cohen, on a Marshall Scholarship, after graduating from Yale University with a bachelor's degree in political science summa cum laude in 1986.

Prior to moving to the London School of Economics in 2013, Otsuka was Professor of Philosophy at University College London, where he had taught since 1998, and, before that taught at UCLA and the University of Colorado. He joined Rutgers University in September 2022.

Philosophical work

Otsuka has written extensively in political philosophy on topics such as equality and left-libertarianism. Otsuka is a proponent of actual-consent forms of government, in opposition to the mainstream of political theory which has thought such systems to be unworkable. He has also published articles in normative ethics on the morality of harming and saving from harm.

Otsuka also defends what is known as "equal opportunity left-libertarianism", which interprets

One of Otsuka's most influential articles—cited and critiqued by Jeff McMahan in his own work The Ethics of Killing—is  "Killing the Innocent in Self-Defense" (Philosophy & Public Affairs, 1994) In this article, Otsuka develops what he calls the Moral Equivalence Thesis, according to which Innocent Threat (e.g., the body of Falling Person is about to kill you by crushing you to death but who was thrown off the top of a building by an evil Villain) is on a moral par with Bystander, or one who is not at all responsible for whatever endangers your life. Imagine a javelin is heading toward you and will kill you unless you pull Bystander into its path so it kills Bystander instead. Because it would be morally impermissible to kill Bystander in this way, it would also be morally impermissible for you to kill Falling Person by, say, vaporizing him with a ray gun. Further, it is morally impermissible to kill an Innocent Aggressor, or someone who endangers your life because of her intention to kill you but whose actions are beyond her control. Imagine someone who has been hypnotized and whose aim is to kill you. It is wrong to kill Innocent Aggressor because he is on a moral par with Innocent Threat, who is on a par with Bystander. So, it is wrong to kill Innocent Aggressor because he is on a par, morally, with Bystander.

Bibliography 
 Libertarianism Without Inequality (2003)

References

External links
 Michael Otsuka's homepage

1964 births
Academics of the London School of Economics
Academics of University College London
Alumni of Balliol College, Oxford
American expatriates in the United Kingdom
American libertarians
American male non-fiction writers
American political philosophers
Left-libertarians
Libertarian theorists
Living people
Marshall Scholars
Writers from Palo Alto, California
University of California, Los Angeles faculty
University of Colorado faculty
Yale College alumni